Saint-Uze is a commune in the Drôme department in southeastern France.

Geography
The Galaure forms most of the commune's southern border.

Population

Notables
Félix-Marie Abel

See also
Communes of the Drôme department

References

Communes of Drôme